The Fish was a radio station in Taupo, New Zealand.

The station began in 1995 as 94.3FM The Fish broadcasting on 94.3FM. The station broadcast from premises on the first floor at 30 Heu Street in Taupo.

94.3FM The Fish had a unique way of positioning themselves in the small Taupo market. The studio line was aptly named The Fishing Line, the company vehicle (a Fiat Uno Van) was called The Fish Tank, and they had a Hot Rod called the Fishing Rod. Other first's for radio in Taupo included live broadcasting from the popular night spot, The Holy Cow. Broadcast live from 8pm until closing time at 3 am, made for very entertaining radio, with a few complaints being made to the Broadcasting Standards Authority. The Fish also had a full-time request line and also had a guarantee that the same song would not be played again from 6am to 12 midnight.  In general, there was no specific playlist, and announcers chose songs that fitted into the categories that were assigned for the time slot.

In 1997 the station moved to 91.6FM and subsequently became known as 91.6FM The Fish. This shift, under new management and ownership, (MultiMedia Services, Taupo) saw the station change genre to a more AC mix than the 'loose' format they had on 94.3FM.  The former 94.3FM frequency, which was leased from Iain Stables, was sold to RadioWorks to broadcast The Rock into Taupo. In 2000 the station was purchased by The Northland Radio Company, a company which operated KCC FM in the Northland region, one in Rotorua (The Mix 94.3FM) and another in Taupo (The Mix 95.9FM).  They renamed The Fish to Taupo's 91.6FM. Later in 2000 the station was taken over by The Radio Network and closed down and replaced with Radio Hauraki.

External links
 94.3FM The Fish Facebook Page

Radio stations in New Zealand
Mass media in Taupō
Defunct radio stations in New Zealand